Rummu is a small borough in Lääne-Harju Parish, Harju County, northern Estonia. As of 2011 Census, the settlement's population was 1,088, of which the Estonians were 288 (26.5%).

See also
 Rummu quarry
 Murru Prison
 Rummu Prison

References

External links
 Vasalemma Parish 

Boroughs and small boroughs in Estonia